Simon Baker (born 1969) is an Australian actor.

Simon Baker may also refer to:

 Simon Baker (pilot), British aviator
 Simon Baker (Canadian actor) (born 1986), Aboriginal Canadian actor
 Simon Strousse Baker (1866–1932), American president of Washington & Jefferson College
 Simon Baker (racewalker) (born 1958), Australian race walker
 Simon Baker (priest) (born 1957), Archdeacon of Lichfield